Glarner Kantonalbank is the cantonal bank and the dominant retail banking group in the Swiss canton of Glarus. 

In 2014, the bank was listed in the SIX Swiss Exchange.

Branches
In addition to the headquarters in Glarus, there are branches in Niederurnen, Näfels, Netstal, Schwanden and Linthal, but not in Glarner Sernftal, which is traditionally served by Glarner Regionalbank AG.

Ownership
On 11 May 2010, Glarner Kantonalbank was transformed from an institution under public law into a public limited company under special law. Until an IPO in July 2014, it was wholly owned by the Canton of Glarus, with a majority stake of 68.24%. In addition to traditional advice in the mortgage and savings business, commercial lending, investment advice and asset management have gained in importance. Like the vast majority of all cantonal banks, the Glarus-based bank also has a so-called state guarantee. This means that the canton is liable for the liabilities of the bank.

Organisation
The Board of Directors is the supreme supervisory body of the Glarner Kantonalbank. It consists of seven members and is currently chaired by Martin Leutenegger. According to Art. 14 para. 2 of the law on the Cantonal Bank of Glarus, the Government Council (cantonal executive) must be represented on the Board of Directors by at least one member. Rolf Widmer, Head of the Department of Finance and Health, represents the Government Council.

The operational management is in the hands of the management. It consists of four members and is headed by Hanspeter Rhyner.

See also
Cantonal bank
List of Banks in Switzerland

References

External links 

 

Cantonal banks
Banks established in 1884
Swiss companies established in 1884
Companies listed on the SIX Swiss Exchange